Trīsciems is a neighbourhood of Riga, the capital of Latvia.

The total area of ​​Trīciems neighborhood is 11,319 km², which is about two times more than the average area of the neighborhood in Riga.

References

Neighbourhoods in Riga